Eureka Township may refer to:

 Eureka Township, Adair County, Iowa
 Eureka Township, Sac County, Iowa, in Sac County, Iowa
 Eureka Township, Barton County, Kansas
 Eureka Township, Greenwood County, Kansas
 Eureka Township, Kingman County, Kansas
 Eureka Township, Mitchell County, Kansas, in Mitchell County, Kansas
 Eureka Township, Rice County, Kansas, in Rice County, Kansas
 Eureka Township, Saline County, Kansas
 Eureka Township, Michigan
 Eureka Township, Dakota County, Minnesota
 Eureka Township, Valley County, Nebraska
 Eureka Township, Ward County, North Dakota, in Ward County, North Dakota
 Eureka Township, Aurora County, South Dakota, in Aurora County, South Dakota
 Eureka Township, Brookings County, South Dakota, in Brookings County, South Dakota

Township name disambiguation pages